The 1956 Florida gubernatorial election was held on November 6, 1956. Incumbent Democrat LeRoy Collins defeated Republican nominee William A. Washburne Jr. with 73.69%  of the vote.

Primary elections
Primary elections were held on May 8, 1956.

Democratic primary

Candidates
LeRoy Collins, incumbent Governor
Sumter de Leon Lowry Jr., businessman, retired National Guard general, opponent of racial integration, and anti-communist activist
C. Farris Bryant, former State Representative
Fuller Warren, former Governor
Peaslee Streets 	
W.B. "Bill" Price

Results

General election

Candidates
LeRoy Collins, Democratic
William A. Washburne Jr., Republican

Results

References

1956
Florida
Gubernatorial